Narambuenatitan is a genus of lithostrotian titanosaur sauropod from late Cretaceous (lower-middle Campanian stage) deposits of northern Patagonia of Argentina. Narambuenatitan is known from the holotype MAU-Pv-N-425, an incomplete skeleton. It was collected in 2005 and 2006 from the Anacleto Formation (Neuquén Group) in northern Patagonia. It was first named by Leonardo S. Filippi, Rodolfo A. García and Alberto C. Garrido in 2011 and the type species Narambuenatitan palomoi. The generic name refers to Puesto Narambuena. The specific name honours the discoverer, Salvador Palomo.

Narmabuenatitan was assigned to the clade Lithostrotia in a trichotomy with Epachthosaurus and the more derived clade Eutitanosauria.

References

Late Cretaceous dinosaurs of South America
Fossil taxa described in 2011
Lithostrotians